Cherry Point may refer to:
 Marine Corps Air Station Cherry Point, a military airfield in North Carolina
 Cherry Point Refinery, a headland and oil refinery in Washington State